Dongfang Shuo is a 2008 Chinese historical and biographical television series centered on Dongfang Shuo, a Han dynasty scholar-official, fangshi ("master of esoterica"), author, and court jester to Emperor Wu (r. 141–87 BCE). It is base on the novel Wisdom Holy Dongfang Shuo by Dongfang Longyin. The series was jointly by China Central Television, Beijing Film Academy and Guangdong Donghexing Recording and Video Company. The series stars Cheng Qian as Dongfang Shuo, the rest of the main cast includes Jin Dong, Hu Ke, Qin Hailu, Yu Xiaowei, Liu Xiyuan, Hu Yajie, Tao Huimin, and Zhang Lingxin. It originally aired on CCTV-8 in August 2008.

Synopsis
This is the story of Dongfang Shuo, a Han dynasty scholar and court jester to Emperor Wu of Han.

Dongfang Shuo was different from the other scholars and officials in the reign of Emperor Wu. He even fell in love with a prostitute named Luo Qi and a royal named Princess Pingyang. Because of his uniqueness, his advice wasn't accepted and his rank stayed the same. However, the Emperor never punished Dongfang Shuo and instead allowed Dongfang Shuo by his side. Dongfang Shuo was clever, and helped resolve conflicts in the Emperor's harem (Chen Jiao and Wei Zifu), changed Heqin methods, and advised the Emperor on how to defeat the Xiongnu. Yet, the Emperor's arrogance would let his empire suffer. The Xiongnu were victorious in several battles, and the young general Huo Qubing dies in battle. Dongfang Shuo realized that the Emperor will never listen to his advice, and eventually left his side.

Cast

Main
 Cheng Qian as Dongfang Shuo
 Jin Dong as Emperor Wu
 Hu Ke as Princess Pingyang
 Qin Hailu as Luo Qi
 Yu Xiaowei as Wei Qing
 Bao Bei'er as Huo Qubing
 Liu Xiyuan as Liu Nan
 Hu Yajie as Qiankunzi
 Tao Huimin as Empress Dowager Wang 
 Zhang Lingxin as Empress Chen Jiao
 Liu Jingjing as Wei Zifu

Supporting
 Ni Tu as Dou Wangsun
 Han Jingru as Empress Dowager Dou
 Wang Yunsheng as Sima Qian
 He Shengwei as Gan Fu
 Wang Lan as Aunt Qiu 
 Ren Tianye as Jing Kui
 Ma Wenzhong as Wang Pi
 Yu Tong as Wang Huai'e
 Xie Ning as Qiu Hu
 Ba Ning as Yang Deyi
 He Tao as Zhang Tang
 Cai Hongxiang as Ming Fei
 Wang Tong as Li Shaojun
 Wang Yonggui as Gongsun Hong
 Tian Erxi as Gong Yang
 Li Li as Lvy Yu
 Zhang Xingzhe as Dou Wei
 Chen Hai as Dou Yong
 Wu Xu as Dou Meng
 Cui Zhigang as Li Cai
 Shi Wenjia as Liu Hao
 Zhang Yi as Gan Qi
 Liu Zhengyu as Li Weihu
 Liu Jing as Lian'er
 Guo Wenxue as Jin Buhuan
 Li Jiang as Yi Sheng

Music

Production
Jin Dong, who won a Huabiao Award nomination for his performance in Autumn Rain last year, was cast as Emperor Wu. Qin Hailu, a Golden Horse Award for Best Actress winner, signed on to star as Luo Qi, a prostitute who has a mixed feelings with Dongfang Shuo in the drama. Yu Xiaowei, acclaimed for his performance in The Promise'', joined the cast as General Wei Qing.

The series was shot on location in Zhuzhou.

References

External links
 
 

2008 Chinese television series debuts
2008 Chinese television series endings
Television shows based on Chinese novels
Chinese historical television series
Television series set in the Western Han dynasty
Emperor Wu of Han